John W. A. Sanford Sr. (August 28, 1798 – September 12, 1870) was a plantation manager, military officer, land agent, and politician from Georgia. He served as Secretary of State of Georgia and in the United States House of Representatives.

Sanford was born near Milledgeville, Georgia, in 1798. He attended Yale University and was a farmer. In 1832, he was elected a major general, 3rd Division Georgia Militia, by the Georgia Legislature.  In 1834, Sanford was elected as a Jacksonian Representative from Georgia to the 24th United States Congress, but he resigned before the end of his term to participate in the removal of the Cherokee from the state. His congressional service spanned from March 4, 1835, to July 2, 1835.

After serving in the Creek War of 1836 as a major general, Sanford was elected to the Georgia Senate in 1837; however, he resigned before that session of the state Senate began. From 1841 to 1843, Sanford was the Secretary of State of Georgia. He also was a member of the state convention of 1850. Sanford served as secession commissioner from Georgia to the State of Texas in 1861.  Sanford died in Milledgeville on September 12, 1870, and was buried in Memory Hill Cemetery in Milledgeville.

His Sanford Emigrating Company was contracted to remove Creek Native Americans. He advocated for Americans to own slaves and denounced any laws protecting fugitive slaves as unconstitutional. Sanford testified he owned about 56 slaves.

Sanford married Mary Ann Ridley (born 1802) daughter of Richard Augustus Blount and Mary Edmunds née Dawson Blount. She inherited plantation lands and slaves from her father. His son John W. A. Sanford Jr. later served as Attorney General of Alabama.

Notes and references

Additional sources

 Smith, Gordon Burns, History of the Georgia Militia, 1783-1861, Volume One, Campaigns and Generals, Milledgeville: Boyd Publishing, 2000. ASIN:B003L1PRKI.

External links

1798 births
1870 deaths
People from Baldwin County, Georgia
Yale University alumni
Members of the Georgia House of Representatives
Georgia (U.S. state) state senators
Secretaries of State of Georgia (U.S. state)
Burials at Memory Hill Cemetery
American militia generals
Jacksonian members of the United States House of Representatives from Georgia (U.S. state)
19th-century American politicians
American slave owners